Dugan or Duggan is an Irish surname derived from Ó Dubhagáinn.

History
A family of the name Dugan had its territory near the modern town of Fermoy in north Cork, and were originally the ruling family of the Fir Maighe tribal group which gave its name to the town.  They also claimed descent from Mug Ruith, the legendary magician of the Fir Bolg.  They ceded pre-eminence to the O'Keeffe family in the eleventh century, but remained powerful in the area.  Along with the other Fir Maighe families they lost their power when the Normans conquered the territory in the twelfth and thirteenth centuries.  By the 12th century, family names or surnames had become well established in Ireland in the lands of the Sogain where an illustrious Dugan family held prestige and power due to their descent from the druid Mog Rutih.  Some historians believe that with the change over to Christianity, the druids carried on with their profession of "filí" or seers. These "filí" were socially very important and held in the same esteem as the king. They enjoyed many privileges and were exempt from military duties. They were the custodians of the oral tradition, which embraced genealogy and history.  In Ireland, a man enjoyed his status, rights and privileges in virtue of his descent so that genealogical material was of high political consequence.  Dynasties ruled kingdoms by virtue of descent from ancient royal lineages and their genealogy was proof of their legitimacy to rule.  Strangely enough, there is no genealogical record available for the Dugans themselves, and Roderick O'Flaherty, the famous 17th century Galway scholar says in his "Ogygia" that no line of pedigree can be found in any of the authenticated Irish annals which is very strange as this family were professors of poetry and history.

The Dugans had their homelands in Fohenagh, east Galway. There are a number of townland names in the area which bear testimony to this i.e. Ballydoogan (Dugan's town), Carterdoogan (Dugan's quarter) and Dundoogan (Dugan's Fort).  Some twentieth-century historians and genealogists mistakenly give Ballydugan near Loughrea as the seat of the Dugans but this place has no connection whatsoever with the Dugan clan.  This townland was originally known as Ballygardugan or O'Hrdaganstown, and with the passage of time the "gar" was dropped, leaving it Ballydugan.

The most celebrated and best known member of the family is Seán Mór Ó Dubhagáin who was author of: Tiallim timpeall na Fodla, a poem which is generally regarded as a description of pre-Norman Ireland, some two centuries earlier; Ata sund seanchus Ereand, a poem of 564 verses on the kings of Ireland down to the high king Roderick O'Connor; Rioghraidh Laigheamn clannchathaoir, a poem of 224 verses on the kings of Leinster; Teamhair na riogh raith Cormacc, a poem of 332 verses which gives an account of the battles and actions of Cormac Mac Airt; Bliadhain so salus a dath, a poem on the festivals of the year, and Faras Focaill luaidhtear libh, a poem of 292 verses, being a vocabulary of obsolete words.  He is credited with the introduction of a didactic nature into this generic literature which is also evident in the Books of Uí Máine, Lecan and Ballymore. As Seán Mór held the distinction of ollamh or professor, it is logical to conclude that those later scribes were his students.  He retired to the monastery of St.John the Baptist at Rinadoon in Roscommon in 1365 and died there in 1372.

The O'Kellys of Uí Máine acquired much of their power and wealth in the 14th century and to their credit, many aspect of Gaelic learning such as genealogy, grammar, poetry, sagas, history and folklore thrived under their patronage.  To Murtoogh O'Kelly, bishop of Clonfert and later archbishop of Tuam must go the credit of having produced the great genealogical study known as the Book of Uí Máine.  This work was due to his patronage rather than his scholarship, as he employed a staff of six scribes in its production.  We do not know the names of these scribes, but it is almost certain that they were members of the Dugan family, as Roderick O'Flaherty refers to the Book of Uí Máine as "Leabhar Ó Dubhagáin" or "Dugan's book".  So also John Lynch, another noted Galway 17th century scholar who wrote in both Gaelic and Latin, refers to it in his book "Cambronais Eversus" as "Liber Odubhegan and quotes from it on at least six occasions. The Sligo-born Dubhaltach Mac Firbhisigh, a contemporary of O'Flaherty and Lynch, used "Leabhar Ó Dubhagáin" as a source of material for his "Seancahs Síl Ir".  This is fortunate, since four of the fourteen folios of the original text are now lost and the lacuna can be supplied only from Mac Firbhisigh's transcript.

"The Annals of the Four Masters" record the death of Richard Ó Dubhagáin in 1379, John and Cormac in 1440. Donal Ó Dubhagáin is also recorded as having died in 1487. These people must have been of some considerable importance for the annalist deemed it necessary to record their deaths.  The O'Dugans continued to engage in their profession of "filí" and in 1750, Teigh O'Dugan compiled a pedigree of John O'Donnellan of Ballydonnellan. John O'Donovan in his book The Tribes and Customs of Hy Many refers to the old manuscripts of Teige O'Dugan, "an eminent historian of about 90 years ago".  This would coincide with the aforementioned Teig.  It is most likely that Teige was the last if the filí of the old order.

Murchadh Riabhach O'Cuindlis, the scribe who compiled the massive text of the Leabhar breac (1408–11) and who was a native of Ballydacker near Athleague was more than likely of the same stock as the O'Dugans.

Early modern
The Book of Survey and Distribution for the year 1641 records the transfer of land at Ballydoogane in the parish of Fohenagh, barony of Kilconnell, from Teigh O'Doogane to Dennis O'Doogan.  This shows that the O'Duggans still held on to land in their hereditary "tuagh" or country into the seventeenth century. According to Simmington's "Transplantations to Connacht", they lost their lands during the Cromwellian confiscations but in 1658, the commissioners in Loughrea regranted 75 acres to Teigh O'Doogane in the parish of Ahascragh.  Griffith's Valuation shows John O'Doogan in possession of 74 acres 1 rood and 15 perches in the townland of Killasolan, parish of Ahascragh.  Michael Duggan is the present owner of this land.

Later modern O'Duggan
In the 19th and 20th centuries, the greatest concentration of the name Duggan is to be found in Claregalway and in the environs of Galway city.  In the census of 1841, there were 43 families of Duggan listed for the townland of Móinteach (Claregalway) alone.  Even after the devastation of the Great famine (1845–46), Griffith's Valuation of 1855 shows that there were still 29 Duggan households in Móinteach.  There is no reliable record of how they came there but they certainly brought the tradition of the scribe and filí with them.

A notable member of this Duggan clan was the Most. Rev. Patrick Duggan (1813–96), Bishop of Clonfert.  Dr. Duggan was born in Cummer, Corofin, Tuam, on 10 November 1813.  He was ordained to the priesthood in 1841 and appointed curate to the parish of Kilmoylan and Cummer. On the death of the parish priest Canon Cannavan, he became parish priest in charge of the parish until he was elevated to the Bishopric on 14 January 1872.  The period of his priesthood in Cummer coincided with the Famine years and he was conspicuous among the clergy for his exertions in helping the sick and poor. He was a zealous supporter of the Tenant Right Movement and Home Rule. In a by-election which was called for the county in 1872, Dr. Duggan, now Bishop of Clonfert, organised support for Captain J.P. Nolan who was favourably disposed towards tenants rights.  Nolan was elected but lost his seat on the grounds of undue clerical influence and Dr. Duggan was brought to trial with others before the Court of Common Pleas, but the case collapsed and he was acquitted. He died on 15 August 1896 and was buried in the Glasnevin Cemetery in Dublin, favoured by the republican nationalists.

In modern day, the name is found throughout Ireland. In the north, Dugan, Dougan, and Doogan are common, a large portion descended from families originally in County Fermanagh. Doogan is common in County Donegal. Duggan is most prevalent in Dublin, Munster, and the majority of County Cork, County Tipperary, County Wexford, and County Waterford.

Use of the surname in other countries
Dugan and Dougan are also common Scottish names.  Throughout other English speaking countries, Dugan and its many variants, including Duggan, Dougan, Doughan, Doogan, and Duggin are widespread. Dugan ranked 1,705 in surname listings in the 1990 United States Census. In Great Britain, Duggan ranked 1,950 in surname listings from the 1881 Census, then surged to 1,025 in surname listings from the 1996 Electoral roll.

Notable people
Dugan
 Alan Dugan (1923–2003), American poet whose work won the National Book Award and the Pulitzer Prize for Poetry
 Brendan Dugan (born 1952), New Zealand country musician
 Dennis Dugan (born 1946), American actor and film director
 Eileen C. Dugan (1945–1996), New York politician
 Fred Dugan (1933–2018), American football player with the San Francisco 49ers, Dallas Cowboys, and Washington Redskins 
 Ianthe Jeanne Dugan, American journalist 
 James Dugan, various individuals
 Jeff Dugan (born 1981), American football player with the Minnesota Vikings
 Joanne Bechta Dugan (born 1958), American computer engineer
 Joe Dugan (1897–1982), American baseball player from 1917–1931
 Len Dugan (1910–1967), American football player
 Michael Dugan, several people
 Raymond Smith Dugan (1878–1940), American Astronomer, textbook author and professor at Princeton University
 Regina E. Dugan (born 1963), American inventor
 Robert Dugan (born 1959), Australian cricketer
 Timothy Dugan (born 1953), American judge
 Tom Dugan (actor, born 1889) (1889–1955), Irish film actor
 Tom Dugan (actor, born 1961) (born 1961), American theater, film and television actor
 Winston Dugan, 1st Baron Dugan of Victoria (1877–1951), British administrator who served as governor of South Australia

Duggan
 Alfred Duggan (1903–1964), author and historian
 Elena Duggan (born 1983), Masterchef Australia winner
 Hubert Duggan (1904–1943), soldier and Member of Parliament
 Jeremiah Duggan (1980–2003), British student who died in disputed circumstances linked to the LaRouche movement
 Jim Duggan (born 1954), American professional wrestler known as "Hacksaw" Jim Duggan
 Laurence Duggan (1905-1948), American economist and government official; Soviet spy
 Madeline Duggan (born 1994), British actress
 Mark Duggan (1981–2011), British man shot and killed by police in Tottenham, London, England
 Mark Duggan (born 1970), American economist
 Max Duggan (born 2001), American football player
 Mike Duggan (born 1958), American mayor of Detroit, Michigan
 Meghan Duggan (born 1987), American women's ice hockey player
 Marion Duggan (1884–), an Irish suffragist and activist.
 Patrick Duggan (bishop) (1813–1896), Irish Roman Catholic clergyman
 Patrick J. Duggan (1933-2020), American judge
 Robert Duggan (attorney) (1926–1974), Allegheny County District Attorney
 Robert W. Duggan (born 1944), American billionaire entrepreneur and investor
 Seánie Duggan (1922–2013), Irish hurler
 Toni Duggan (born 1991), English association footballer

Doogan
 Bailey Doogan (born 1941), American artist
 Dave Doogan (born 1973), Scottish politician
 Mike Doogan (born 1948), American writer, journalist and politician

Dougan
 Bobby Dougan (1926–2010), Scottish footballer
 Derek Dougan (1938–2007), Northern Ireland footballer
 Rob Dougan (born 1969), Australian music composer

Ó Dubhagáin
 Seán Mór Ó Dubhagáin (died 1372), Irish Gaelic poet

Fictional characters
 Duggan, a police detective Inspector as played by Tom Chadbon in the 1979 Doctor Who story City of Death, written by David Agnew – a pseudonym for the combined efforts of Douglas Adams and Graham Williams rewriting an original script by David Fisher
 Dum Dum Dugan, an officer of S.H.I.E.L.D. and is one of the most experienced members of Nick Fury's team, known for his marksmanship with rifles and for his impressive physique.
 Pat Dugan, a superhero from DC Comics, wears an armoured suit called S.T.R.I.P.E. Former member of the Seven Soldiers of Victory and once the sidekick to the Star-Spangled Kid. Stepfather to Courtney Whitmore.

See also
 Fermoy

References

Further reading
 Burke, Henry Patrick. The Burke-Duggan Family From Oppression to Freedom. [S.l.]: H.P. Burke, 1981.
 Duggan, Edward Vincent. Duggan, Walton, Martin Descendants of Bartholomew and Mary Cummings Duggan Including Family Biographical and Historical Data, John and Henrietta Shirley Wathen Including Ancestral Data, Joseph and Elizabeth Martin Walton (Wathen), Daniel and Elizabeth Livers Martin Including Ancestral and Historical Data. Baltimore, MD: Gateway Press, 2002.
 Murphy, Hilary. Families of Co. Wexford. Dublin: Geography Publications, 1986. 
 Nichols, Robert E. From the Cottage at Duggan's Cross A Duggan Family History: the Immigrant Generation with an Account of the Allied Heffernan Family. Hammond, Ind: R.E. Nichols, 1996.
 Ó Murchadha, Diarmuid. Family Names of County Cork. Dun Laoghaire, Co. Dublin, Ireland: Glendale Press, 1985.

External links

 Dugan/Duggan/Dougan/Doogan Genealogy Homepage and Archive
 Site providing a history of the Dugan/Duggan/Dougan/Doogan surname

Surnames of Irish origin
English-language surnames